Boljanići is a settlement in the Kotor Varoš municipality, in the Republika Srpska entity of Bosnia and Herzegovina.

Population

See also
Kotor Varoš

References

Villages in Republika Srpska
Populated places in Kotor Varoš
Kotor Varoš